José Lenoir (born October 5, 1972 in Boulogne-sur-Mer) is a French sprint canoer who competed in the mid-2000s. At the 2004 Summer Olympics in Athens, he was eliminated in the semifinals of both the C-2 500 m and C-2 1000 m events.

References
 Sports-Reference.com profile

1972 births
Canoeists at the 2004 Summer Olympics
French male canoeists
Living people
Olympic canoeists of France
People from Boulogne-sur-Mer
Sportspeople from Pas-de-Calais